A stretcher-bearer is a person who carries a stretcher, generally with another person at its other end, especially in a war or emergency times when there is a very serious accident or a disaster.

In case of military personnel, for example removing wounded or dead from a battlefield, the modern term is combat medic who will have received considerable training. Stretcher-bearers would have received basic first-aid training. The wounded soldier had to wait until the stretcher-bearers arrived or simply the stretcher-bearers will find them.

In times of war, stretcher-bearers may in certain situations be covered by Art. 25 of the First (Geneva) Convention of 1949 under the category of auxiliary medical personnel.

Origin 
This term appears between 1875 and 1880. It is largely used before and up to the Second World War and is derived from the British English verb to stretcher means "to carry someone on a stretcher".

A stretcher-bearer party, sometimes a stretcher party or company, is a group or a band of people temporarily or regularly associated which have to carry injured persons with stretchers. In the army stretcher-bearers were a kind of specific soldiers who work with military ambulances and medical services. A famous stretcher-bearer and ambulance driver during the First World War was the young Ernest Hemingway.

See also
 Air-sea rescue
 Air ambulance
 Ambulance
 Lifeguard 
 Medical assistant
 Medical evacuation
 Polytrauma

Notes

References
Martine Da Silva-Vion, Jacques Theureau, "Stretcher bearers Autonomy Coordination with Units" in Healthcare systems ergonomics and patient safety, human factor, a bridge between care and cure, Riccardo Tartaglia, Sabastiano Bagnara, Tommaso Bellandi, Sara Abolino (editors), Taylor & Francis, London, 2005, 546 pages, § page 185-196.

External links
 Definition and usage with quotations in literature and poetry
 The Stretcher Bearer Party painted around 1918 by the lieutenant Cyril Barraud (1877–1965) masterpiece from the Canadian War Museum
 Photograph of stretcher-bearer party, National Library of Scotland
 The Dead Stretcher-bearer painted by Gilbert Rogers

Health care occupations